Nemesis is a semi-cooperative science fiction Polish board game for 1-5 players, designed by Adam Kwapiński and published by Awaken Realms in 2018. The game is set in the spaceship Nemesis, and includes co-operative mechanisms with other confrontational mechanisms and conflicting objectives. Upon its release, Nemesis was positively received for its replayability, tension, and components, but its high complexity was met with criticism.

Gameplay 
In Nemesis, players take on the roles of crew members of the spaceship Nemesis, having been woken from hibernation by the ship's computer due to an infestation of alien creatures dubbed Intruders. Suffering from temporary amnesia, they must explore the ship and try to get back to Earth while dealing with the alien threat, and also have hidden objectives, which may conflict with other player's goals. The game also combines co-operation mechanisms with bluffing, backstabbing, and other elements of a science-fiction survival horror adventure, and is played in 15 turns. To win the game, they must not be eliminated at the end of the game, reach Earth and achieve their chosen objectives using asymmetrical characters. It is possible for none, some or all of the players to win. Nemesis also has co-operative and solo modes.

Reception 
The game received positive reviews upon its release. Dan Thuort from Ars Technica complimented its engagement, replayability, theme, and the player elimination mechanism. He also considered the game to be similar to Alien franchise, concluding that "[rather] than elegant, the game is evocative. Don’t let the piles of plastic fool you—this is one of the most carefully arranged storytelling games of the past year". Writing for Tabletop Gaming, Dan Jolin also considered it to be similar to Alien franchise, praising its engagement, solo mode, components, and the combination of co-operative and confrontational elements, but criticised its length, complexity, and player elimination. It was also a nominee for the 2018 Golden Geek Best Thematic Board Game. Its expansion Nemesis Lockdown was also complimented by GamesRadar, with the reviewer Matt Thrower praising its narrative, replayability, tension, and component quality. However, he was critical of the accessibility, stating that the "rules are very complex and presented in an obtuse rulebook rife with minuscule fonts, confusing cross-references, and mislabelling".

Expansions and Spinoffs 
 Nemesis Lockdown - In May 2020, Awaken Realms launched a new Kickstarter campaign for Nemesis Lockdown, a stand-alone expansion set on Mars. Some aspects of the original game will be compatible with the expansion.
 Nemesis: Distress - In June 2020, IGN announced a trailer for Nemesis: Distress, a first-person multiplayer horror game for PCs on the Steam platform.
 Nemesis Lockdown - In early 2022, the game was ported to PC.

References

External links 
 Nemesis on Awaken Realms
 Nemesis on BoardGameGeek
 Nemesis: Aftermath and Voidseeders on BoardGameGeek
 Nemesis: Carnomorphs on BoardGameGeek

Board games introduced in 2018
Polish board games
Science fiction board games
Survival fiction
Horror board games
Cooperative board games
Adventure board games